The Viraja Homa is a Hindu fire-sacrifice which is performed during the ceremonies whereby a Hindu monk takes up the vows of renunciation (Sannyasa). The Viraja Homa is thus part of the full Sannyasa Deeksha (monastic initiation).  This Homa is also performed while preparing or making Vibhooti (Bhasma)from pure cow dung.  This is performed during the every month of Shivarathri day generally.  During this Homa some portions from the Maha Narayanopanishad are chanted with related Prayogas as prescribed.

See also
 Homa (ritual)
 Sanyasa
 Deeksha

Yajna